Cheshmeh Rizak may refer to:
 Cheshmeh Rizak-e Shabliz